Mohibur Rahman Manik is a Bangladesh Awami League politician and the incumbent member of parliament for Sunamganj-5.

Early life
Manik was born on 28 February 1962. He has an LLB degree from the University of Dhaka.

Career
Manik was elected to parliament from Sunamgaj-5 in 1996. In his first year, he worked to establish a memorial in Banshtala, the headquarters of Liberation Sector Five, and renamed it to Hoqnagar (City of Hoque) after local freedom fighter Abdul Hoque.

His home in Sylhet was attacked with bombs on 15 March 1999. The bombs were thrown through the window and killed two of his relatives. He was not present at home during the attack. He is the former vice-president of Sunamganj District unit of Bangladesh Awami League.

Manik was elected to Parliament from Sunamganj-5 in 2008 and reelected on 5 January 2014 as a candidate of Bangladesh Awami League.

References

Awami League politicians
Living people
1962 births
10th Jatiya Sangsad members
University of Dhaka alumni
11th Jatiya Sangsad members
9th Jatiya Sangsad members
7th Jatiya Sangsad members
People from Chhatak Upazila